The Dutch Eerste Divisie in the 2000–01 season was contested by 18 teams. FC Den Bosch won the championship.

New entrants
Relegated from the 1999–2000 Eredivisie
 Cambuur Leeuwarden
 FC Den Bosch
 MVV

League standings

Promotion/relegation play-offs
In the promotion/relegation competition, eight entrants (six from this league and two from the Eredivisie) entered in two groups. The group winners were promoted to the Eredivisie.

See also
 2000–01 Eredivisie
 2000–01 KNVB Cup

References
Netherlands - List of final tables (RSSSF)

Eerste Divisie seasons
2000–01 in Dutch football
Neth